The 2011–12 Calgary Dinos women's ice hockey season represented a season of play in Canadian Interuniversity Sport women's ice hockey. The Dinos finished the season by winning the 2012 CIS Women's Ice Hockey Championship. It was the first CIS championship in program history.

Offseason
Iya Gavrilova, a member of the Russian national team since 2003, has been recruited to join the Calgary Dinos.

Preseason

Carleton Ravens invitational tournament

Regular season
September 27, 2011: Hayley Wickenheiser was honoured as a CIS  Top Eight Academic All-Canadian. She became the first Calgary Dinos student-athlete to earn the top academic honour in CIS since soccer player Kelly Matheson in 2000.

Season standings

Postseason
On February 25, 2012, Iya Gavrilova scored the game-winning goal in the deciding game of the 2012 Canada West tournament, as the Calgary Dinos claimed their first ever tournament title.

Awards and honors
Hayley Wickenheiser, Top 8 Academic All-Canadians
Amanda Tapp, CIS Championship Most Valuable Player
Amanda Tapp, Canada West female athlete of the week (Week of March 13, 2012)

Canada West All-Stars
2012 Canada West First Team All-Star: Iya Gavrilova, Forward
2012 Canada West First Team All-Star: Stephanie Ramsay, Forward
2012 Canada West First Team All-Star: Hayley Wickenheiser, Forward
2012 Canada West Second Team All-Star: Melissa Zubick, Forward

References

Calgary
Cal